General Sir Charles Cooper Johnson  (20 December 1827 – 7 December 1905) was a senior British Indian Army officer.

Johnson was the sixth son of Sir Henry Johnson, 2nd Baronet, and a grandson of Sir Henry Johnson, 1st Baronet. He commissioned into the 33rd Bengal Native Infantry. He later transferred into the Bengal Staff Corps, which was amalgamated into the Indian Staff Corps in 1861. He was promoted to Major on 7 June 1864. In 1877, while holding the rank of Colonel, he was made a Companion of the Order of the Bath. He was promoted to the rank of full General on 1 April 1894. Johnson was made Knight Grand Cross of the Order of the Bath in the 1900 Birthday Honours.

References

1827 births
1905 deaths
British Indian Army generals
Indian Staff Corps officers
Knights Grand Cross of the Order of the Bath
British people in colonial India
Younger sons of baronets